Zea luxurians, also referred to by the common names Maíz de Monte, Florida teosinte and Guatemalan teosinte, is a species of flowering plant in the family Poaceae. 
It is a true grass and a teosinte.

Distribution
It is native to Guatemala, Honduras and Mexico, but it can also be found in areas where it has been introduced, including Brazil, Colombia, and French Guiana.

References

luxurians
Grasses of Mexico
Grasses of North America
Flora of Guatemala
Flora of Honduras
Flora of Mexico
Plants described in 1978
Taxa named by Michel Charles Durieu de Maisonneuve
Taxa named by Paul Friedrich August Ascherson